Chaos, This Is is the final film from the Egyptian director Youssef Chahine.

Synopsis 
Hatem, a shady police officer, handles it with an iron hand. Every single citizen fears and hates him. Only Nour, a young woman he lusts after, dares stand up to him. But Nour is secretly in love with Cherif. Green with envy, Hatem tries to come between them. He wants Nour for himself and he rapes her and after she exposed him, the neighborhood mobilizes in a popular riot and occupies the police station, the film ends with Hatim shooting himself in the angry crowd.

External links 
 
 

2007 films
French crime drama films
2000s Arabic-language films
Egyptian crime drama films
Films directed by Youssef Chahine
Films about rape
2000s French films